Bothe is a surname. Notable people with the surname include:

Detlef Bothe (born 1957), East German sprint canoeist
Detlef Bothe (actor) (born 1965), German actor
Elsbeth Levy Bothe (1927–2013), American attorney and judge
Hans-Werner Bothe (born 1952), German philosopher and neurosurgeon
Heinz-Jürgen Bothe (born 1941), German Olympic rower
Herta Bothe (1921–2000), female Nazi concentration camp guard
Ida Bothe (fl. 1881–1890), German-American artist and educator
Roger Bothe (born 1988), American soccer player
Sabine Bothe (born 1960), German handball goalkeeper
Walther Bothe (1891–1957), German nuclear physicist and winner of the Nobel Prize in Physics

See also
Bothe-Napa Valley State Park, a state park of California, USA
Bodhe (disambiguation)
Both (disambiguation)
Botha, a surname
Bothy, a shelter

German-language surnames